The Xerxes I inscription at Van, also known as the XV inscription, is a trilingual cuneiform inscription of the Achaemenid King Xerxes I (486–465 BC). It is located on the southern slope of a mountain adjacent to the Van Fortress, near Lake Van in present-day Turkey. When inscribed it was located in the Achaemenid province of Armenia. The niche was originally carved out by Xerxes' father, King Darius (522–486 BC), but he left the surface blank.

Text

The inscription consists of 27 lines of writing in Old Persian, Elamite and Babylonian. The inscription reads the same in each language. A translation into English reads:

Position
Placed high off the ground, in a region where there was very little literacy, the text had an additional meaning for those who were able to read, or to whom it was read aloud. In the opening sentence, Xerxes I mentions Ahuramazda, thus connecting himself to the religion of his father Darius, making use of language similar to that his father used for his imperial inscriptions in Iran proper. In this inscription, Xerxes I makes it clear that he reigns through the legitimation of his god Ahuramazda, the greatest god, the creator god. By mentioning his descent from Darius, Xerxes I asserts that he is the lawful ruler of the Achaemenid Empire. Xerxes I also shows that he is a good son and a good king, as he finished the work initiated by his father. According to Elspeth R. M. Dusinberre (2013): "The inscription practically reiterates the campaign against Greece that was responsible for Xerxes' personal presence in Anatolia". She thus concludes that the inscription at Van is far from "a mildly risible description of filling an empty space; rather, it serves as a highly visible and exceptionally powerful royal statement of empire and authority, situated in a spot charged with historical meaning and kingly significance".

Amélie Kuhrt (2007) wonders why Darius chose this particular spot for an inscription: "The siting of the niche is in a prominent position, but the reason for Darius' wish to leave an inscription here in particular is unknown. Could it have been connected with the many battles he fought in this region following the seizure of the throne?" Lori Khatchadourian (2016) states that the spot was specifically chosen to show that the area was now part of another power. By placing the inscription at the fortress of Tushpa (i.e. the Van Fortress), in the center of the former entity of Urartu, Darius and Xerxes "were making a claim on the former foundations of authority that had long prevailed in the region", now remade as a province of the Achaemenid Empire.

Assessment
The inscription at Van carries numerous messages. Being one of only few attested Old Persian inscriptions outside Iran, it "overtly extends kingly reach into the "mountains and valleys of Anatolia" according to Dusinberre. According to Dusinberre, by making use of only "Mesopotamian and Persian languages", the Achaemenid kings made a firm statement about that kingly reach: "This is a conquering overlord, a foreigner of power, who now exerts authority over the ancient lands of Urartu". The fact that the inscription was not translated into the local language supports this, according to Dusinberre. There had been a long history of military conflict between Urartu and Assyria; the choice of these specific languages was an outright affirmation of Achaemenid control over Armenia, and of Achaemenid military superiority over Assyria. Dusinberre adds that the Old Persian text takes up twice as much room as the Babylonian and Elamite versions. Furthermore, the Old Persian text is "carved slightly larger" and with more "generous spacing between the characters". According to Dusinberre: "This may be intended similarly to convey a comment about the superiority of the Achaemenid Persians over the ancient Mesopotamian peoples". As the inscription is located high off the ground, and so is difficult to read from ground level, Dusinberre deems these small visual details important.

See also
 History of Achaemenid Egypt
 List of Iranian artifacts abroad

Languages

References

Sources
 
 
 

5th-century BC works
Achaemenid inscriptions
Akkadian inscriptions
Ancient Armenia
Archaeological discoveries in Turkey
Archaeology of the Achaemenid Empire
Cuneiform
Elamite language
Old Persian language
Urartu
Van Province
Xerxes I